Daniel Johnson Morrell (August 8, 1821 – August 20, 1885) was a Republican member of the U.S. House of Representatives from Pennsylvania.

Early life
Morrell was born in North Berwick, York County, Maine. He attended public schools and moved to Philadelphia, Pennsylvania in 1836, and entered a counting room as clerk. He later engaged in mercantile pursuits.

Career
In 1855 he moved to Johnstown, Pennsylvania, and became general manager of the Cambria Iron Company, which was the greatest manufacturer of iron and steel in the United States until the Johnstown Flood. Morrell also served as president of the local gas and water company from 1860 to 1884 and as president of the First National Bank of Johnstown from 1863 to 1884. He was president of the city council for many years.

Morrell was elected as a Republican to the Fortieth and Forty-first Congresses.  He served as chairman of the United States House Committee on Manufactures during the Fortieth and Forty-first Congresses.  He was an unsuccessful candidate for reelection in 1870.  He was a commissioner to the Paris Exposition of 1878.

Johnstown Flood
Morrell became a member of the South Fork Fishing and Hunting Club, site of the South Fork Dam, which formed Lake Conemaugh, in order to keep a watchful eye on the dam under its stewardship, and campaigned to club officials, especially to its founder, Benjamin Franklin Ruff, regarding the safety of the dam. Morrell sent multiple letters to Ruff, expressing his concerns about the dam. The failure of that dam eventually caused the great Johnstown Flood of May 31, 1889, which killed more than 2,200 people, and was then the largest disaster in U.S. history. Morrell insisted on inspections of the dam's breastwork both by his own engineers and those of the Pennsylvania Railroad. Morrell's warnings went unheeded, and his offer to effect repairs, partially at his own expense, was rejected by club president, Benjamin F. Ruff (who died two years prior to the flood). Morrell died four years before the Johnstown Flood; his membership was then bought by his colleague, Cyrus Elder, who was legal counsel for the Cambria Iron and Steel Company.

Death and legacy
Morrell was again engaged in banking and died on August 20, 1885, in Johnstown, Cambria County, Pennsylvania.

He is the namesake of the ill-fated .

References

External links
 

The Political Graveyard

Pictorial History: Daniel J. Morrell 1906 - 1966
Great Lakes Vessel Online Index: DANIEL J. MORRELL 
Lakeland Boating: The Morrell Survey

Politicians from Johnstown, Pennsylvania
1821 births
1885 deaths
People from North Berwick, Maine
Pennsylvania city council members
Republican Party members of the United States House of Representatives from Pennsylvania
19th-century American politicians